NGC 210 is a barred spiral galaxy located roughly 67 million light-years from the Solar System in the constellation Cetus. It was discovered on October 3, 1785 by William Herschel and later added to the New General Catalogue.

Physical properties
It appears to be in loose association with NGC 157 and NGC 131. It is noted for its peculiar arms, which appear to be in the process of becoming a ring galaxy. They also have several apparently dense regions throughout them. The inner part of the galaxy appears to be lenticular, with a dust lane in it. The nucleus of the galaxy appears much brighter than the rest of it, suggesting an active galactic nucleus.

Satellites

In the image at the right, 2MASX J00403079-1353088 is the edge-on galaxy directly below the brightest star in the image. It is possibly a satellite of NGC 210, but without a redshift to determine its distance, it could just as possibly be completely unrelated to NGC 210.

Supernovae

15.9 magnitude SN 1954R was observed on September 7 in the outer edge of NGC 210's left arm and is likely associated with the galaxy.

Gallery

References

External links
 

Intermediate spiral galaxies
Barred spiral galaxies
0210
2437
17851003
Cetus (constellation)